Streptomyces albulus is a bacterium species from the genus  of Streptomyces. Streptomyces albulus produces acetoxycycloheximide, aciphenol, albanoursin and cycloheximide.

See also
 List of Streptomyces species

References

Further reading

External links
Type strain of Streptomyces albulus at BacDive -  the Bacterial Diversity Metadatabase

albulus
Bacteria described in 1969